The NucleaRDB is a database of nuclear receptors. It contains data about the sequences, ligand binding constants and mutations of those proteins.

See also
Nuclear receptor

References

External links
 https://web.archive.org/web/20120409204749/http://www.receptors.org/nucleardb/.

Biological databases
Intracellular receptors
Protein families
Transcription factors